The  nineteen series of the British reality television programme The Only Way Is Essex was confirmed on 3 June 2015 when it was announced that it had renewed for at least a further six series, taking it up to 21 series. It is the fourth series to be included in its current contract. The series will launch on 9 October 2016 with a The Only Way is Marbs special. It includes the first appearances of new cast members Ben Shenel and Ercan Ramadan. Mario Falcone and Frankie Essex also made a surprise one-off return to the series during the final episode of the series to celebrate Chloe Sims's 35th birthday. Love Island winners Nathan Massey and Cara De La Hoyde both made another guest appearance during the eighth episode. Original cast member James Argent was also absent for most of this series. A further two Essexmas specials aired in December 2016, where Danni Armstrong announced her departure from the series.

The series focused heavily on Bobby's mission to conquer his fears, the breakdown of Amber and Chris's relationship causing a divide between the boys and the girls, and the aftermath of Lockie and Danni's shock break-up.

Cast

Episodes

{| class="wikitable plainrowheaders" style="width:100%; background:#fff;"
! style="background:#FAAC58;"| Seriesno.
! style="background:#FAAC58;"| Episodeno.
! style="background:#FAAC58;"| Title
! style="background:#FAAC58;"| Original air date
! style="background:#FAAC58;"| Duration
! style="background:#FAAC58;"| UK viewers

|}

Reception

Ratings

References

The Only Way Is Essex
2016 British television seasons
2016 in British television